The 2nd Cavalry Division was a Division of the Red Army that existed during World War II.

History 
The 2nd Cavalry Division (2nd Formation) was a cavalry division of the Red Army that existed in 1941.  The division was formed from the original 1st Odessa Cavalry Division in early 1941.  It only had a short history as it was re-organized into the 2nd Rifle Division (3rd Formation) in late November 1941.

Organization on Formation 
Structure of the division in August 1941:

 Headquarters
 7th Cavalry Regiment
 16th Cavalry Regiment
 20th Cavalry Regiment (Led by Ilya A. Lukanov, 1899-1942)

Organization on Disbandment 
Structure of the division in November 1941:

 Headquarters
 7th Cavalry Regiment
 15th Cavalry Regiment
 20th Cavalry Regiment
 9th Armoured Cavalry Squadron
 Armoured Defense Group
 3rd Naval Infantry Regiment (attached)
323rd Separate Anti-Aircraft Artillery Divizion (battalion)
Mortar Platoon
Machine-Gun Platoon
Separate Cavalry Squadron
Separate Communications Squadron
Separate Chemical Defense Squadron

References 

Cavalry divisions of the Soviet Union
Military units and formations established in 1941